Thiago Fernandes may refer to:
 Thiago Augusto (Thiago Augusto Fernandes, born 1990), footballer 
 Thiago Fernandes (footballer, born 1992)
 Thiago Fernandes (footballer, born 2001)

See also
 Tiago Fernandes (disambiguation)
 Thyago Fernandes (born 1985), Brazilian footballer